Lorie K. Logan (born 1972/1973) is president and CEO of the Federal Reserve Bank of Dallas.

Biography 
Logan is a native of Versailles, Kentucky, and holds a bachelor's degree in political science from Davidson College and a master's degree in public administration from Columbia University.

Logan previously served as manager of the System Open Market Account for the Federal Open Market Committee, then as executive vice president of the Federal Reserve Bank of New York, where she led Market Operations, Monitoring and Analysis from 2012 through 2022. She joined the Federal Reserve Bank of New York in 1999 as a financial analyst and played a key role in implementing the central bank's emergency programs during the COVID-19 pandemic.

She was named the president and CEO of the Federal Reserve Bank of Dallas on May 11, 2022 and is the first woman to hold the role in a permanent capacity.

References 

Davidson College alumni
Federal Reserve Bank of Dallas presidents
Living people
People from Versailles, Kentucky
School of International and Public Affairs, Columbia University alumni
Year of birth missing (living people)